Edmond "Eddie" Paea (born 8 February 1988) is a dual-code rugby international rugby footballer for Tonga. Beginning his professional career playing rugby league with the South Sydney Rabbitohs in the National Rugby League, Paea made his debut for the Tongan rugby league team at the 2008 Rugby League World Cup, before changing to rugby union and representing the Tongan rugby union team. Eddie currently plays for his junior team, the Mascot Juniors RLFC in the A Grade South Sydney Junior Rugby League competition which Eddie returned to in 2019.

Background
Paea was born in Sydney, New South Wales, Australia.

Rugby league career
Paea made his NRL debut for the Rabbitohs in round 26 of the 2006 season against the Wests Tigers. A Junior Kiwi representative, Paea was named in Tonga's squad for the 2008 World Cup. Paea scored his first senior international try in the World Cup match against Scotland on 8 November 2008. He also converted one try. Paea spent the majority of his time whilst contracted with South Sydney playing for their feeder team, the North Sydney Bears, in the NSW Cup. Paea made a total of 42 appearances for Norths, scoring 15 tries, kicking 79 goals and scoring a total of 218 points.

Rugby union career
Paea played Rugby Union in Krasnoyarsk Russia for Krasny Yar  as a first-5. They are currently the holders of the Russian Cup and were the 2015 Russian Champions.

References

External links
Krasny Yar Profile
Video
Video

1988 births
Living people
Australian people of New Zealand descent
Australian sportspeople of Tongan descent
Australian rugby league players
Dual-code rugby internationals
Niue national rugby league team players
North Sydney Bears NSW Cup players
Rugby league halfbacks
Rugby league hookers
Rugby league players from Sydney
South Sydney Rabbitohs players
Tonga international rugby union players
Tonga national rugby league team players
Wests Tigers NSW Cup players